Siberian Strike is a series of top-down shooters video games developed and published by Gameloft. Games in the series typically focus on classic "shoot'em'up" genre, set in an alternate world immediately after the end of World War II. The player flies into Siberian territory to face off against evil soviet forces. The goal of the game is the destruction of the Stalin-Bot, a crossbreed of Stalin and the future MIR Space Station, who owns the vodka producing company Stalinka Corp. The company is behind a communist invasion because they produce genetically engineered vodka that completely annihilates the willpower of those who drink it.

In terms of gameplay, Siberian Strike is a vertical-scrolling top-down-shooter, in the likes of popular Capcom's 1942 series. The player moves his plane around the screen in order to avoid the enemy projectiles while firing all available cannons and collecting the power-ups dropped by destroyed enemies. Most of the levels feature one or more bosses.

Siberian Strike is the original Palm OS version of the game. It was later ported in two parts for feature phones (Episode I & II)  and remade in expanded form as Air Strike 1944: Flight for Freedom

Released in 2006 for Pocket PC and Windows, Siberian Strike X is an upgraded reboot of the original version.

Released in 2009 for iOS and Android, the latest installment in the Siberian Strike series includes the story and features all the levels which were previously released in two parts as Siberian Strike and Siberian Strike: Episode II. The game is a complete remake featuring improved graphics in 3D, animations and additional content.

The game was generally positively received by mobile critics. Slide to Play and PocketGamer were two of the various outlets who gave glowing reviews.

Games 
These are the list of games in this series:

 Siberian Strike (Palm OS) 2001
 Siberian Strike: Episode I (J2ME) 2002
 Siberian Strike: Episode II (J2ME) 2003
 Air Strike 1944: Flight for Freedom (J2ME) 2006
 Siberian Strike X (Pocket PC, Windows, Windows Mobile) 2006
 Siberian Strike 3D (iOS) 2009

References 

Alternate history video games
Android (operating system) games
Cold War video games
Cultural depictions of Joseph Stalin
Gameloft games
IOS games
Mobile games
Palm OS games
Vivendi franchises
Science fiction video games
Scrolling shooters
Symbian games
Video games developed in France
Video games set in the Soviet Union
Windows Phone games
Windows games
J2ME games
Video game franchises
Video game franchises introduced in 2001